Colored dissolved organic matter (CDOM) is the optically measurable component of dissolved organic matter in water. Also known as chromophoric dissolved organic matter, yellow substance, and gelbstoff, CDOM occurs naturally in aquatic environments and is a complex mixture of many hundreds to thousands of individual, unique organic matter molecules, which are primarily leached from decaying detritus and organic matter. CDOM most strongly absorbs short wavelength light ranging from blue to ultraviolet, whereas pure water absorbs longer wavelength red light. Therefore, water with little or no CDOM, such as the open ocean, appears blue. Waters containing high amounts of CDOM can range from brown, as in many rivers, to yellow and yellow-brown in coastal waters. In general, CDOM concentrations are much higher in fresh waters and estuaries than in the open ocean, though concentrations are highly variable, as is the estimated contribution of CDOM to the total dissolved organic matter pool.

Significance 

The concentration of CDOM can have a significant effect on biological activity in aquatic systems. CDOM diminishes light intensity as it penetrates water. Very high concentrations of CDOM can have a limiting effect on photosynthesis and inhibit the growth of phytoplankton, which form the basis of oceanic food chains and are a primary source of atmospheric oxygen. However, the influence of CDOM on algal photosynthesis can be complex in other aquatic systems like lakes where CDOM increases photosynthetic rates at low and moderate concentrations, but decreases photosynthetic rates at high concentrations. CDOM concentrations reflect hierarchical controls. Concentrations vary among lakes in close proximity due to differences in lake and watershed morphometry, and regionally because of difference in climate and dominant vegetation. CDOM also absorbs harmful UVA/B radiation, protecting organisms from DNA damage.

Absorption of UV radiation causes CDOM to "bleach", reducing its optical density and absorptive capacity. This bleaching (photodegradation) of CDOM produces low-molecular-weight organic compounds which may be utilized by microbes, release nutrients that may be used by phytoplankton as a nutrient source for growth, and generates reactive oxygen species, which may damage tissues and alter the bioavailability of limiting trace metals.

CDOM can be detected and measured from space using satellite remote sensing and often interferes with the use of satellite spectrometers to remotely estimate phytoplankton populations. As a pigment necessary for photosynthesis, chlorophyll is a key indicator of the phytoplankton abundance. However, CDOM and chlorophyll both absorb light in the same spectral range so it is often difficult to differentiate between the two.

Although variations in CDOM are primarily the result of natural processes including changes in the amount and frequency of precipitation, human activities such as logging, agriculture, effluent discharge, and wetland drainage can affect CDOM levels in fresh water and estuarine systems.

Measurement 
Traditional methods of measuring CDOM include UV-visible spectroscopy (absorbance) and fluorometry (fluorescence).  Optical proxies have been developed to characterize sources and properties of CDOM, including specific ultraviolet absorbance at 254 nm (SUVA254) and spectral slopes for absorbance, and the fluorescence index (FI), biological index (BIX), and humification index (HIX) for fluorescence.  Excitation emission matrices (EEMs) can be resolved into components in a technique called parallel factor analysis (PARAFAC), where each component is often labelled as "humic-like", "protein-like", etc.  As mentioned above, remote sensing is the newest technique to detect CDOM from space.

See also
 Blackwater river
 Color of water
 Dissolved organic carbon (DOC)
 Ocean turbidity
 Secchi disk

References

External links

The Color of the Ocean from science@NASA

Aquatic ecology
Chemical oceanography
Environmental chemistry
Organic chemistry
Water chemistry
Water quality indicators
Water supply